Marri Channa Reddy (13 January 1919 – 2 December 1996) was an Indian politician active in several states. He was the Chief Minister of Andhra Pradesh from 1978 to 1980 and from 1989 to 1990. He also served as the governor of Uttar Pradesh (1974–1977), governor of Punjab (1982–1983), governor of Rajasthan from February 1992 to May 1993, and governor of Tamil Nadu from 1993 until his death. He was a leader of Indian National Congress Party.

Reddy was among the stalwarts who headed the Telangana movement of Andhra Pradesh in the late 1960s. He also has the credit of being one of the youngest ministers; He became a minister of Andhra Pradesh at the age of 30.

Early life
Marri Channa Reddy was born to Marri Lakshma Reddy and Buchamma on 13 January 1919 in Siripuram village (currently in Marpally Mandal), Atraf-i-Balda, Hyderabad State. He obtained his MBBS degree in 1941. He was the founder of Andhra Yuvajana Samiti and Students Congress. He was associated with several student, youth, social, educational, literary and cultural organisations. He edited a weekly for about two years and has also contributed articles to leading dailies and Journals.

Political life
He took active part in the political struggle in the erstwhile Hyderabad State and in 1942 was the General Secretary of Andhra Mahasabha (which was a precursor of the State Congress). In 1946, he became a member of the Standing Committee of the State Congress and General Secretary of Hyderabad City Congress. He was one of the founders and as well General Secretary of the Ideological K.M.P.Group in the Congress. He was General Secretary of the Andhra Provincial Congress Committee for several years and a member of the P.C.C Working Committee for 30 years.

Tenure as Member of Legislature and Parliament
In 1950, Reddy was nominated to the Provisional Parliament and was appointed Whip of Congress Parliamentary Party. He was elected member of the Hyderabad Legislative Assembly in the first General Elections and from 1952–1956 was Minister for Agriculture and Food, Planning_and Rehabilitation in Hyderabad State. As Minister he held the Indian Delegation to the World Conference of Agriculturists held in Rome under the auspices of the F.A.O. in 1953, Subsequently, in 1955, he represented India as the Deputy Leader of the Indian Delegation to F.A.O. Conference in Rome.

He opposed Telangana merger with Andhra State and was one of the four signatories to Gentleman's agreement after which Andhra Pradesh state formed.

He was elected to the Andhra Pradesh Legislative Assembly again from Vikarabad constituency. During 1957–62, he was a member of the Public Accounts Committee, twice Chairman of the Estimates Committee and Chairman of the Andhra Pradesh Regional (Telangana) Development Committee in State Legislative Assemably. In 1962 he was again elected, now from Tandur Constituency, and was Minister for Planning and Panchayat Raj and later for Finance, Commercial Taxes and Industries. In 1967, he was again returned to the Legislative Assembly and was Minister for Finance, Education and Commercial Taxes. He resigned the State Ministry on his appointment as Minister for Steel, Mines and Metals in the Union Cabinet (1967–68).  Subsequently, in April 1967, he was elected to the Rajya Sabha.

As Minister for Steel and Mines, he introduced several reforms to improve production and brought about decontrol of distribution of steel and coal. At the invitation of the British Government he visited the U.K for talks on steel industry and other allied matters. He resigned from the Union Cabinet in April 1968.

Role in the First Telangana Movement
Reddy took an active part in several public movements and played a notable role in the split of the Congress political party.  He also a took an active role in the movement for a separate Telangana State. Chenna Reddy became president of the Telangana Praja Samiti, then a popular youth movement, so as to politicalize the movement. This party supporting the separation secured the popular mandate in terms of winning 11 Loksabha seats (out of 14 seats). As head of the movement for separate Telangana he made a significant contribution in resolving the issues. He is credited for drafting of the Six Point Formula in 1971. This was later incorporated as 'New Deal for Telangana' in the Congress Manifesto when the elections to the Andhra Pradesh Assembly took place in 1972.

Tenure as Governor of Uttar Pradesh
In 1974, Reddy accepted the office of Governor of Uttar Pradesh, the most populous State of the country on a reported personal plea of Indira Gandhi made that she required Reddy's assistance to help her as the Governor of Uttar Pradesh, her home State. However this is widely seen as a reward for ending the Separate Telangana Movement. As Chancellor for the state Universities, he set a practice of conferring Honorary Degrees on great scholars and renowned scientists from others parts of the country, particularly, from the South. He also administered the state when it came under President's rule within 55 days of him taking office. He sought advice from leaders of repute and public men like Nirmal Chandra Chaturvedi, CB Gupta and Ali Zaheer to cleanse the state administration.

Tenure as Chief Minister

He was twice the chief minister of Andhra Pradesh. Reddy successfully brought the congress party to power on two occasions. He was the Pradesh Congress Committee President. He has also been Governor of Uttar Pradesh (during president rule in the mid-1970s), Rajasthan, Punjab, Tamil Nadu and Pondicheri. He was actually the person who created the peace process and eradication of terrorism in Punjab while being the Governor there.

Personal life
Reddy was married to M. Savitri Devi and had two sons and a daughter. His younger son, Marri Shashidhar Reddy, was Vice Chairman of National Disaster Management Authority (NDMA) with a Union Cabinet status; he was also a four-time MLA from Sanathnagar.

Reddy arrived in Hyderabad on 1 December 1996 from Chennai to attend his grandson's wedding. He was taken to a private hospital in the city after he complained of a chest pain at around midnight before he slipped into coma. He died at 7 a.m. the following day there.

In an obituary, author Parsa Venkateshwar Rao wrote of Reddy: "Marri Chenna Reddy was an eternal rebel in Andhra politics. He never toed any line, be it a party or a leader. He dared his cautious peers, and did not hesitate to antagonise them though he never had permanent enemies. He held positions of power on his own terms, and lost them too for the same reasons."

References

Union Ministers from Telangana
 
Telangana politicians
Telugu politicians
Telangana Praja Samithi politicians
Indian National Congress politicians
People from Ranga Reddy district
People from Telangana
1919 births
1996 deaths
Chief ministers from Indian National Congress
Rajya Sabha members from Andhra Pradesh